Iostephane heterophylla is a species of rosette-forming herbaceous perennials that produce heads of purple flowers. It is found across southwest Mexico, from Chihuahua to Oaxaca.

References

Heliantheae
Flora of Mexico
Plants described in 1873